Peru has some of the greatest biodiversity in the world. It belongs to the select group of mega diverse countries because of the presence of the Andes, Amazon rainforest, and the Pacific Ocean. It has the fourth-most tropical forests of any country and the ninth-most forest area.

Natural protected areas

The Constitution of Peru of 1993 recognized the natural resources and ecosystem variety of its country as a heritage. In 1900, the National System of Natural Areas that are protected by the Peruvian Government (SINANPE) was created. This entity depends on the National Institute of Natural Resources (INRENA). They also created a map of protection and preservation of historical - cultural heritage and nature.

This map has 49 Natural Areas (10% of the country surface) that are preserved by the Government: 8 National Parks, 8 National Reservations, 6 National Sanctuaries, 3 Historical Sanctuaries, 4 National Forests, 6 Protection Forests, 1 Communal Reservation, 2 Hunting enclosed lands and 11 Reserved Zones.

National Parks are places where the wild flora and fauna are protected and preserved. Natural resources exploitation and human settlements are forbidden.

Peru has over 53 natural protected areas throughout the country.

Animals
Peru has over 1,800 species of birds (120 endemic to Peru), and 500 species of mammals and over 300 species of reptiles. Peru has hundreds of mammals including some rare species like the puma, jaguar and spectacled bear, that live in the canopy so jungle lodges usually construct towers to observe life above. The Pacific holds a bounty of sea bass, flounder, anchovies, tuna, crustacean (crab or lobster), shellfish and seals. The Pacific also has a lot of sharks, sperm whales, and whales. The birds of Peru have an economic importance, because of the concentrations of guano deposits that are exported to different countries. Alpaca is also a native of Peru which is now domesticated for its fiber.

Insects
As of March 2009 scientists have discovered two new species of beetles, Eriopis canrash and Cycloneda andresii.

Mammals

Peru has over 500 species of mammals, of which about 70 are endemic and about 109 are threatened or endangered. These include spectacular species like the jaguar and spectacled bear and rare endemic species like the yellow-tailed woolly monkey.

In January 2007, scientists discovered a new species of cloud-forest rodent of the spiny rat family (Isothrix barbarabrownae) in Manu.

In March 2009, scientists discovered a new species of mouse (Akodon sp.nov)

Birds

Peru's national bird is the Andean cock-of-the-rock.

Peru has over 1,800 species of birds, the second-highest number of any country in the world. New species of birds are still being discovered and cataloged by scientists. 42 species from Peru have been officially added to science in the last 30 years. In January 2010, scientists found a new population of five long-whiskered owlets which are very rare in the wild.

On February 22, 1990, Grace P. Servat found a new distinctive species of the tyrant flycatcher called the rufous twistwing. Which remained undescribed and unidentified until re-discovered by Daniel F. Lane in November 2002. Then on September 15, 2003, Frank P. Lambert obtained the first-natural history of the bird.

The Manu Biosphere Reserve is believed to have the highest concentration of bird species in the world, with 1,000—one out of every nine on the Earth.

Reptiles
Peru has around 300 species of reptiles of which around 100 are endemic. Peru's reptile fauna includes spectacular species like giant anacondas and caimans, as well as many other snakes, lizards and turtles.

Amphibians
There are about 380 species of frogs in Peru (based on this search at the Amphibian Species of the World website). It is easy to see a few species on night hikes in the lowland rain forest areas in Tambopata, Manu or Iquitos. Ten new frog species have been discovered over the past two years in the cloud forests of the Peruvian Andes.

Frogs

Some species of frog found in Peru are:
 Monkey frog - Phyllomedusa bicolor
 Tree frog - Dendropsophus rhodopeplus
 Three-striped poison dart frog - Epipedobates trivittatus

Salamanders
 Nauta mushroomtongue salamander - Bolitoglossa altamazonica
 Rio Santa Rosa salamander - Bolitoglossa digitigrada
 Peru mushroomtongue salamander - Bolitoglossa peruviana

In March 2009, scientists discovered a pygmy frog. The pygmy frog is unlike many other species of frog because its eggs don't become tadpoles like those of most frogs. Also, they only lay two eggs.

Plants

Peru also has an equally diverse amount of plants. The coast of Peru is usually barren apart from some cacti that grow there. Hilly areas known as lomas such as Lachay, include many endemic species. The river valleys also contain unique plant life. The Highlands above the tree-line is known as puna, where bushes, cactus and drought-resistant plants, such as ichu grass extend up to the zone of snow-capped mountains. The most spectacular plant in Peru is the gigantic Puya raimondii seen near Huaraz. On the lower slopes of the Andes are steep-sided cloud-forests with among it can sustain moss, orchids, and bromeliads. The very wet Amazon rainforest contains useful lumber, and resins plus strange canopy plants and palm trees.

As of March 2009 scientists have discovered a new kind of plant Senecio sanmarcosensis which is part of the high-Andean wetlands vegetation.

Locations
Peru has some good locations to watch all of this wildlife:
 Bahuaja-Sonene National Park
 Ballestas Islands (Islas Ballestas)
 Colca Canyon
 Huascarán National Park - This park is located in the central part of Peru. It includes El Huascaran - the highest peak in Peru. Special species include the spectacled bear and the vicuña.
 Iquitos
 Manú National Park - Manu is located on the eastern slopes of the Andes and stretches to the lowland rain forest on the Brazilian border.
 Pacaya-Samiria National Reserve - It is located in the headwaters of the Amazon River in northeastern Peru, on an alluvial plain between the Marañon and Ucayali river systems. It is accessible via the Amazon River through the city of Iquitos in the department of Loreto, or through the city of Tarapoto via Yurimaguas. This is one of the best places for wildlife spotting, which is a Ramsar site and the largest government-protected area in the floodable Amazon rainforest in South America.
 Pampa Galeras National Reserve.

See also
List of Peruvian monkey species

References

External links

 Peru Wildlife

 List of mammals of Peru
 Checklist of the Amphibians Inhabiting the Iquitos Region, Loreto, Peru by William W. Lamar, 1998. It includes 165 species of frogs, 4 salamanders, and 17 caecilians.

Peru
Natural history of Peru